Ben Willmore is an American photographer, author and founder of Digital Mastery, a training and consulting firm that specializes in photography and Photoshop. He is best known for his digital imaging expertise and for writing the book Photoshop Studio Techniques.

Career
Willmore, who attended the Minneapolis College of Art and Design and the University of Minnesota-Twin Cities, is a Photoshop instructor and a featured speaker at publishing conferences and events. He is a regular contributor to MacWorld magazine and had a monthly column in Photoshop User magazine. His book, Photoshop Studio Techniques is printed in nine languages: English, French, German, Greek, Chinese, Spanish, Czech, Japanese, Polish.

In 2004, Willmore was a recipient of a Photoshop Hall of Fame Award.

Up to Speed, one of Willmore's books, was described in Rob Galbraith's blog as "perhaps the most useful book we've picked up on Photoshop in a long time ... because it painstakingly outlines what's new in CS2." About his book Adobe Photoshop CS3 Studio Techniques, Blogcritics' T. Michael Testi wrote that it "covers all of the fundamental techniques that you need to become proficient with Photoshop and it shows you how to accomplish tasks by teaching."

Willmore lives in a 40-foot bus and spends his time photographing America in between speaking engagements.

Books
Adobe Photoshop 5.0 Studio Techniques (1999, Adobe Press)
Adobe Photoshop 6.0 Studio Techniques (2001, Adobe Press)
Adobe Photoshop 7.0 Studio Techniques (2002, Adobe Press) ( paperback,  eBook)
Adobe Photoshop CS Studio Techniques (2004, Adobe Press)
Adobe Photoshop CS2 Studio Techniques (2005, Adobe Press)
Adobe Photoshop CS3 Studio Techniques (2007, Adobe Press)
Adobe Photoshop CS4 Studio Techniques (2009, Adobe Press)
Adobe Photoshop CS2: Up to Speed (2005, Peachpit Press)
Adobe Photoshop CS3: Up to Speed (2007, Peachpit Press)
Adobe Photoshop CS4: Up to Speed (2008, Peachpit Press)
How to Wow: Photoshop for Photography (2004, Peachpit Press)

References

External links
 digitalmastery.com Official Digital Mastery site
 Publisher's biography of Willmore

American photographers
American technology writers
Living people
Year of birth missing (living people)